Makarena Diana Dudley, also known as Margaret Dudley, is a New Zealand clinical psychologist, neuropsychologist and academic, specialising in neuropsychology, dementia and Māori health psychology research. She is currently one of the co-directors of the clinical psychology programme at the University of Auckland. In 2016, Dudley became the first permanent Māori clinical psychology lecturer employed at the University of Auckland. Dudley's iwi include Te Rarawa, Te Aupōuri and Ngāti Kahu.

Biography

Dudley was one of ten children growing up in central Auckland, attending Blockhouse Bay Intermediate and Lynfield College, leaving at 15. In 1970 Dudley joined the Royal New Zealand Air Force, being promoted to sergeant at 18. In 1980, Dudley wed and moved to Australia, having a child with her partner. By 1985 she and her partner had divorced, and Dudley raised her child solo while working as a courier driver and cleaner. In 1990, Dudley returned to New Zealand, studying at the University of Auckland, funding her studies through Te Rūnanga o Te Rarawa. By 1996 she had graduated with a post-graduate diploma in clinical psychology.

After graduating, Dudley worked as a clinical psychologist in Auckland and Northland for 15 years. In 2008, she was awarded a fellowship to complete a doctorate in neuropsychology at the University of Waikato investigating the efficacy of Attention Process Training during stroke recovery, which began as a part of the Stroke Attention Rehabilitation Trial (START), which she competed in 2011. After completing her doctorate, Dudley was employed by the Auckland University of Technology, where she researched neuropsychology. In 2016, Dudley became the first permanent Māori clinical psychology lecturer employed at the University of Auckland.

In 2017, Dudley was named by Health Research Council of New Zealand as the principal investigator of a team to investigate misdiagnosis of Māori with dementia. By 2020, Dudley was still only one of four Māori neuropsychologists in New Zealand. In 2020, Dudley was awarded a fellowship by Alzheimers New Zealand, in order to further research on the impacts of dementia. As a part of this project, a smartphone app was released to help families identify early signs of mate wareware (dementia), while following Tikanga Māori.

Selected works

References

External links
  
 

Academic staff of the Auckland University of Technology
Living people
Year of birth missing (living people)
New Zealand Māori women academics
New Zealand psychologists
New Zealand women academics
New Zealand women psychologists
People educated at Lynfield College
Psychology educators
Royal New Zealand Air Force personnel
Ngāti Kahu people
Te Aupōuri people
Te Rarawa people
University of Auckland alumni
Academic staff of the University of Auckland
University of Waikato alumni
People from Auckland